The Lowlands ( or ;) is a cultural and historical region of Scotland. Culturally, the Lowlands and the Highlands diverged from the Late Middle Ages into the modern period, when Lowland Scots replaced Scottish Gaelic throughout most of the Lowlands.

Geography 
The Lowlands is not an official geographical or administrative area of the country. There are two main topographic regions: the  Lowlands and the Southern Uplands. The term "Lowlands" mainly refers to the  Central Lowlands. However, in normal usage it refers to those parts of Scotland not in the Highlands (or Gàidhealtachd). The boundary is usually considered to be a line between Stonehaven and Helensburgh (on the Firth of Clyde). The Lowlands lie south and east of the line. Note that some parts of the Lowlands (such as the Southern Uplands) are not physically "low," Merrick for example reaching , while some areas indisputably in the Highlands (such as Islay) are low-lying.

For other purposes, the boundary varies; but if the Boundary Fault is used, then the traditional Scottish counties entirely in the Lowlands are Ayrshire, Berwickshire, Clackmannanshire, Dumfriesshire,  East Lothian, Fife, Kinross-shire, Kirkcudbrightshire, Lanarkshire, Midlothian, Peeblesshire, Renfrewshire, Roxburghshire, Selkirkshire, West Lothian, and Wigtownshire. Prior to 1921, the counties of East Lothian, Midlothian, and West Lothian were known as Haddingtonshire, Edinburghshire, and Linlithgowshire.

Traditional Scottish counties which straddle the Boundary fault include Angus, Dunbartonshire, Stirlingshire, Perthshire, Kincardineshire, Aberdeenshire, Banffshire, and Moray.

Geographically, Scotland is divided into three distinct areas: the Highlands, the Central plain (Central Belt, in the Central Lowlands), and the Southern Uplands. The Lowlands cover roughly the latter two. The northeast plain is also "low-land," both geographically and culturally, but in some contexts may be grouped together with the Highlands.

The term Lowlands is sometimes used in a more restricted sense to refer specifically to the Midland Valley. Much of this area, which has a characteristic structure of sedimentary rocks with coal deposits, lies within the basins of the Rivers Forth and Clyde. Historically, this valley has been the most agriculturally productive region of Scotland. During the 19th and early 20th centuries, coal deposits promoted concentrated industrial activity and urbanization in the Midland Valley, where 80 percent of the population of Scotland now live (3.5 million in the Central Belt). While coal mining and other heavy industry have declined in the region, it remains at the centre of the Scottish economy, with electronics and computer manufacture and service sectors such as telecommunications, computer software, and finance.

The southernmost counties of Scotland, nearest the Anglo-Scottish border, are also known as the Borders. They are sometimes considered separately from the rest of the Lowlands. Many ancestors of the Scotch-Irish, as they are known in the United States, or Ulster-Scots, originated from the lowlands and borders region before migrating to the Ulster Plantation in the 17th century and later the American frontier, many prior to the American Revolution.

The term Scottish Lowlands is used with reference to the Scots language in contrast to the Scottish Gaelic spoken in the Highlands (although historically also in the lowlands until the 15th century and 18th century in Galloway), to the Scottish history and to the Scottish clan system, as well as in family history and genealogy.

Notes

 
Historical regions in the United Kingdom
Geography of Scotland

Highland Boundary Fault